Mark Richard Stuart (born 15 December 1966 in Hammersmith) is an English former professional footballer who played as a midfielder for Charlton Athletic, Plymouth Argyle, Ipswich Town, Bradford City, Huddersfield Town, Rochdale, Chesterfield, Southport, Stalybridge Celtic and Guiseley.

References

External links

 Mark Stuart profile at Ipswich Town Talk

1966 births
Living people
Footballers from Hammersmith
English footballers
Association football midfielders
Charlton Athletic F.C. players
Plymouth Argyle F.C. players
Ipswich Town F.C. players
Bradford City A.F.C. players
Huddersfield Town A.F.C. players
Rochdale A.F.C. players
Chesterfield F.C. players
Southport F.C. players
Stalybridge Celtic F.C. players
Guiseley A.F.C. players
English Football League players